Following the 2017 election an untraditional alliance consisting of the Social Democrats, the Green Left, the Christian Democrats and Danish People's Party supported Kasper Glyngø from the Social Democrats as mayor.

However, despite the parties receiving a seat majority again in this election, the Christian Democrats and Danish People's Party would support Ole Vind from Venstre as mayor.

Electoral system
For elections to Danish municipalities, a number varying from 9 to 31 are chosen to be elected to the municipal council. The seats are then allocated using the D'Hondt method and a closed list proportional representation.
Hedensted Municipality had 27 seats in 2021

Unlike in Danish General Elections, in elections to municipal councils, electoral alliances are allowed.

Electoral alliances  

Electoral Alliance 1

Electoral Alliance 2

Electoral Alliance 3

Electoral Alliance 4

Results

Notes

References 

Hedensted